Tamara Vladimirovna Bykova (born December 21, 1958) is a Russian former track and field athlete who represented the Soviet Union and competed in the high jump. She is the 1983 World Champion, the 1987 World Championship silver medallist, the 1988 Olympic bronze medallist, and is a former world record holder, with clearances of 2.03 and 2.04 metres in 1983 and 2.05 metres in 1984. She also won silver medals at the 1982 European Championships, the 1989 and 1991 World Indoor Championships, and three times at the World Cup (1981, 1985 and 1989).

Career
Bykova was born in Azov, Rostov, Russia and first came to international attention at the 1980 Olympic Games in Moscow, where she finished ninth in the final with 1.88 meters.  Six weeks later she won the Soviet championship with a jump 1.97 meters. At the 1981 World Cup in Rome, she cleared 1.96 m to finish second to West Germany's Ulrike Meyfarth, who set a new world record with a jump of 2.02 meters.  At the 1982 European championship in Athens, Bykova cleared 1.97 m to again finish second to Meyfarth.  Then at the 1983 European Indoor Championship in Budapest, she cleared 2.03 meters to win the gold medal and set a new world indoor record.

At the 1983 World Championships in Helsinki, Bykova and Meyfarth were the only to jumpers to clear 1.99 meters, but only Bykova could manage the next height of 2.01 meters, to become the inaugural world champion. The next meeting between the two came one month later at the European Cup in Crystal Palace in London.  This time Meyfarth set a new world record by jumping over 2.03 meters, but only a few minutes later the Russian jumped over the same height to equal the world record, however she had needed one more attempt than the German and had to settle yet again for second place. Only four days later the two met again, this time in Pisa. This time though, Bykova came out on top with a new world record of 2.04 meters.

In June 1984, Bykova once again broke the world record with a clearance of 2.05 metres. This height would remain her lifetime best. The record would stand for only a month, as Bulgaria's Lyudmila Andonova cleared 2.07 metres in July. Bykova was prevented from competing at the 1984 Olympic Games in Los Angeles due to the Soviet boycott.

In 1987, Bykova won a silver medal at the World Championships in Rome, with a clearance of 2.04 metres. The winner was Stefka Kostadinova of Bulgaria, with a new world record of 2.09 metres. At the 1988 Olympic Games in Seoul, Bykova won the bronze medal with 1.99 metres, behind the American gold medal winner Louise Ritter and the silver medallist Kostadinova.

Bykova received a three-month ban when she tested positive for the drug ephedrine at the Goodwill Games in 1990, and missed the European Championships held later that year.

International competitions

See also
List of sportspeople sanctioned for doping offences

External links
Tamara Bykova's profile in the Modern Museum of Sports features her photos and photos of her awards and decorations 

1958 births
Living people
People from Azov
Russian female high jumpers
Soviet female high jumpers
Athletes (track and field) at the 1980 Summer Olympics
Athletes (track and field) at the 1988 Summer Olympics
Doping cases in athletics
Olympic athletes of the Soviet Union
Olympic bronze medalists for the Soviet Union
World record setters in athletics (track and field)
World Athletics Championships medalists
European Athletics Championships medalists
Russian sportspeople in doping cases
Medalists at the 1988 Summer Olympics
Olympic bronze medalists in athletics (track and field)
Universiade medalists in athletics (track and field)
Universiade gold medalists for the Soviet Union
Universiade bronze medalists for the Soviet Union
World Athletics Indoor Championships medalists
World Athletics Championships winners
Medalists at the 1981 Summer Universiade
Medalists at the 1983 Summer Universiade
Competitors at the 1986 Goodwill Games
Competitors at the 1990 Goodwill Games
Goodwill Games medalists in athletics
Friendship Games medalists in athletics
Sportspeople from Rostov Oblast